Mezhova is an urban-type settlement in Synelnykove Raion of Dnipropetrovsk Oblast in Ukraine. It hosts the administration of Mezhova settlement hromada, one of the hromadas of Ukraine. Population: 

Until 18 July 2020, Mezhova was the administrative center of Mezhova Raion. The raion was abolished in July 2020 as part of the administrative reform of Ukraine, which reduced the number of raions of Dnipropetrovsk Oblast to seven. The area of Mezhova Raion was merged into Synelnykove Raion.

Economy

Transportation
Mezhova is on the road which connects Pokrovsk with Vasylkivka. It also has access to the M04 highway, connecting Pokrovsk with Dnipro and Kryvyi Rih.

Mezhova railway station is on the railway line connecting Dnipro via Synelnykove and Chaplyne with Pokvovsk. There is infrequent passenger traffic.

People from Mezhova 
 Vladimir Semichastny (1924–2001), Soviet politician, KGB Chairman 1961–1967

References

Urban-type settlements in Synelnykove Raion